Pelwadiya (පැල්වාඩිය) is a village situated in the Sabaragamuwa Province of southwestern Sri Lanka.

Places of worship 
Pelwadiya Bodhigiri Viharaya

External links 
 Weather Forecast Ratnapura
 FaceBook Group 
 Maha Saman Devale, Ratnapura
 Sabaragamuwa Province

Populated places in Sabaragamuwa Province